Osthoff is a surname. Notable people with the surname include:

Hermann Osthoff (1847–1909), German linguist
Markus Osthoff (born 1968), German football player
Oscar Osthoff (1883–1950), American athlete and coach
Susanne Osthoff (born 1962), German archaeologist
Tom Osthoff (born 1936), American politician